Jean-Louis is a given name, especially for French males.

Notable people named "Jean-Louis" include:

 Jean-Louis (artist), Haitian artist
 Jean-Louis Alléon-Dulac
 Jean-Louis Aubert
 Jean-Louis Baribeau
 Jean-Louis Barrault
 Jean-Louis Baudelocque
 Jean-Louis Beaudry
 Jean-Louis Beffa
 Jean-Louis Béland
 Jean-Louis Bergheaud, better known as Jean-Louis Murat
 Jean-Louis Berlandier
 Jean Louis Berthauldt (1907–1997), a French-born costume designer also known as Jean Louis
 Jean-Louis Borloo
 Jean-Louis Bourlanges
 Jean-Louis Bruguière
 Jean-Louis Buffet
 Jean-Louis Carra (fr) (1742–1793), a French activist and politician
 Jean-Louis Gassée (born 1944), best known as an executive at Apple Computer (1981–1990), later founder of Be Inc
 Jean-Louis Koszul, French mathematician
 Jean-Louis Lefebvre de Cheverus, a French-born American cardinal
 Jean-Louis Loday, French mathematician
 Jean-Louis Mandengue (born 1971), a French boxer
 Jean-Louis Masurel, a French businessman
 Jean-Louis Michel (fencer)
 Jean-Louis Murat
 Jean-Louis Schneiter, French politician
 Jean-Louis Thiériot (born 1969), French politician
 Jean-Louis Valois French professional footballer 
 Jean-Louis Vieillard-Baron (born 1944), French philosopher

As a surname
 Girardin Jean-Louis, American academic
 Jimmy Jean-Louis, Haitian actor
 Joseph Mécène Jean-Louis, Haitian judge

Given names
Compound given names
Masculine given names
French masculine given names